Chermside West is a suburb in the City of Brisbane, Queensland, Australia. Parts of Chermside West were formerly known as Craigslea.

Geography 

History
The name Chermside honours Queensland Governor, Sir Herbert Chermside.

St Gerard Majella's Catholic Church opened in 1962 in Pullford Road. In 1977 the congregation opened the current church in Maundrell Terrace, and the Pullford Road church was later acquired by the Kedron Brook Christadelphians.

The Prince of Peace Lutheran Church opened a church in Maundrell Terrace about 1965. In 1984 the church established the Prince of Peace Lutheran Primary School in Everton Hills. In 1986, the congregation moved to its present location at Everton Hills when a new church was built on the top of the hill adjacent to the college site.

Craigslea State School opened on 24 January 1972.

Craigslea State High School opened on 28 January 1975.

The median age of the Chermside West population was 39 years of age, 2 years above the Australian median. 75% of people living in Chermside West were born in Australia, compared to the national average of 69.8%; the next most common countries of birth were New Zealand 3.8%, England 2.6%, Italy 1.8%, India 1.5%, Philippines 1.2%. 83.6% of people spoke only English at home; the next most popular languages were 2.8% Italian, 1.4% Cantonese, 0.9% Malayalam, 0.9% Mandarin, 0.7% Hindi.

Education 
Craigslea State School is a government primary (Prep-6) school for boys and girls at Hamilton Road. In 2018, the school had an enrolment of 572 students with 46 teachers (40 full-time equivalent) and 37 non-teaching staff (21 full-time equivalent). It includes a special education program.

Craigslea State High School is a government secondary (7-12) school for boys and girls at 685 Hamilton Road. In 2018, the school had an enrolment of 978 students with 95 teachers (85 full-time equivalent) and 49 non-teaching staff (31 full-time equivalent). It includes a special education program.

Amenities
Frederick Annand Park at 632 Webster Road was named after Frederick Annand, the first town clerk of Greater Brisbane from 1925 to 1931. It has an electric BBQ, picnic facilities, playground facilities and a basketball half-court.

There is a shopping centre at 63 Milburn Street. It contains the Chermide West Post Office.

Churches in Chermside West include:

 St Gerard Majella Catholic Church, 146 Maundrell Terrace
 Kedron Brook Christadelphian Ecclesia, 44 Pullford Street

Downfall Creek Bushland Centre is at 815 Rode Road and has cultural and environmental displays. It is operated by the Brisbane City Council.

Notable people

 Michael (Mick) Doohan, motorcycle racing champion, lived in West Chermisde and attended Craigslead State School
 Ben Tune, rugby union player
 Christopher Wrench, organist, made his debut as church organist when he took over playing the harmonium for church services at St. Laurence's church at West Chermside on Palm Sunday, 1969, at the age of 10 years

References

External links

 
 

Suburbs of the City of Brisbane